Piz Alv is a mountain of the Swiss Livigno Alps, located south-east of Pontresina in the canton of Graubünden. It lies in the group culminating at Piz Minor.

References

External links
 Piz Alv on Hikr

Mountains of the Alps
Mountains of Graubünden
Mountains of Switzerland
Two-thousanders of Switzerland
Pontresina